Kristine Hildebrandt is an American linguist who is known for her research into Tibeto-Burman languages and languages of the Himalayas. Her work focuses on the Nar-Phu and Gurung languages and other languages of the Manang District of Nepal, with an expertise in phonetics.

Hildebrandt earned her Ph.D. in Linguistics in 2003 from the University of California, Santa Barbara. She is a Professor of English Language and Literature, and the Co-Director of the Interdisciplinary Research and Informatics Scholarship Center at the Southern Illinois University Edwardsville. Hildebrandt is the editor of the open-access, peer-reviewed journal Himalayan Linguistics, and the President of the Endangered Language Fund (ELF).

Awards and distinctions 

 Editor of the open-access, peer-reviewed journal Himalayan Linguistics
 President of the Endangered Language Fund (ELF)
 2014 Chair of the Linguistics Society of America The Committee on Endangered Languages and Their Preservation

Publications 
 2010. Schiering, R., Bickel, B., & Hildebrandt, K. A. The prosodic word is not universal, but emergent. Journal of Linguistics, 46(3), 657–709.
 2004. Hildebrandt, K.A. A grammar and glossary of the Manange language. Tibeto-Burman Languages of Nepal: Manange and Sherpa, 241.
 2004. Hildebrandt, K.A. Manange tone: Scenarios of retention and loss in two communities (Nepal). PhD Dissertation. University of California, Santa Barbara. 
 2004. Genetti, C., & Hildebrandt, K. The two adjective classes in Manange. Adjective Classes: A cross-linguistic typology, 1, 74.

References

External links 

 Kristine Hildebrandt website
 Interdisciplinary Research and Informatics Scholarship Center
 Himalayan Linguistics
 SIUE’s Hildebrandt Expands International Impact as President of Endangered Language Fund

Linguists from the United States
Women linguists
Phoneticians
University of California, Santa Barbara alumni
Southern Illinois University Edwardsville faculty
Living people
Year of birth missing (living people)